South Fremantle Football Club is an Australian rules football club based in Fremantle, Western Australia. The club plays in the Western Australian Football League (WAFL) and the WAFL Women's (WAFLW), commonly going by the nickname the Bulldogs. Since its founding, the club has won 14 WAFL premierships, the most recent of them in 2020.

Founded in 1900 after disbanding the successful but debt-burdened Fremantle Football Club (not related to the AFL Dockers entity), the club enjoyed its most successful era in the immediate decade following the end of the Second World War, winning six premierships, including a hat-trick from 1952 to 1954.

South Fremantle has a long-standing rivalry with cross-town WAFL club , a fixture commonly referred to as the Fremantle Derby. The club has played at its home ground, Fremantle Oval, from inception and were co-tenants with East Fremantle until 1952, when the Sharks moved to East Fremantle Oval. From the beginning, Souths adopted the club colours red and white, first adding the iconic front vee to its playing jumper in 1928.

For a club with a history of over 120 years, South Fremantle does not yet boast a footballer who has played 300 or more senior League games in the red and white guernsey. The club is also recognized for its significant contribution of players who hail from Indigenous Australian, Italian and Croatian heritage.

History
The Fremantle Football Club (originally known as Unions and unrelated to either an earlier club and the current AFL club of the same name) had won ten premierships in the fourteen years that they were in the WA Football Association (now known as the West Australian Football League). By 1899, however, the club suffered from financial problems that caused the club to disband.  The South Fremantle Football Club was formed to take their place following an application to the league by Griff John, who would be appointed secretary of the new club, with Tom O'Beirne the inaugural president.  Most players, however, were from the defunct Fremantle club.

The new club did well in its first year, finishing runners-up. However, over the next three seasons the performance fell away badly and, in April 1904 a Fremantle newspaper confidently reported that South Fremantle would not appear again. However, the club decided to carry on and centreman Harry Hodge took over as skipper, but the season was a disaster. The club won only one game.

They won their first premiership in 1916 and went back-to-back in 1917, both times defeating their local rivals, East Fremantle in the final and challenge final. The 1930s were not as successful, marred by the death of the 23-year-old captain-coach Ron Doig as a result of injuries sustained in a match. After World War II, South experienced their greatest era, with the arrival of future Hall of Fame members Steve Marsh, Bernie Naylor, John Todd and Clive Lewington. Between 1945 and 1956 they would win six premierships, be runners-up three times and make the finals in every season.   Since then, however, they have won six more premierships, in 1970, 1980, 1997, 2005, 2009 and 2020.

South Fremantle was the first WAFL club to have won 10 grand finals since World War II.  Four of their 14 premierships were won against the club's traditional rivals, East Fremantle. The club completed a rare double in 2009, claiming both the league and reserves premierships. 
This was the first time the club had taken the Premiership double since 1954.

In 2020 the club received a license to field a team in the WAFL Women's league.

Fremantle Derby

The Fremantle Derby, is traditionally one of the biggest game of the year on the WAFL calendar. The derbies still have a great following but have decreased in importance compared to the Western Derby, the match between WA's two AFL teams.

The Foundation Day derby on the first Monday in June (a public holiday to mark the Foundation of Western Australia in 1829) is commonly the highest attended game of the home and away season. To the end of the 2006 season the two clubs had met 344 times with South Fremantle winning 156 to East Fremantle's 184 wins, 4 Draws have occurred between the two sides.

The club

Club guernsey & colours
South Fremantle's Guernsey (shown right) used for all WAFL matches is all white with a red V in the centre of the guernsey. During the 1990s they also introduced the reverse of the traditional guernsey with a white V on a red jumper. The South Fremantle colours of red & white stem from the first Fremantle based team who wore red and white in the mid-1880s.

Supporters
South Fremantle are one of the most supported clubs in the WAFL.

South hold three notable WAFL Grand Final attendance records, 1979 v East Fremantle, 52,781, the highest ever attendance at a WAFL Grand Final, 1975 v West Perth, 52,322, the second highest ever Grand Final attendance and 1989 v Claremont, 38,198, the highest ever Grand Final attendance in the post AFL period.

On Foundation Day v East Fremantle at East Fremantle Oval, South played in front of the biggest crowd of the 2009 WAFL home and away season 11,300.

Souths average attendance at home and away fixtures is 3000, which is amongst the highest for the WAFL.

Club song
"We're the Bulldogs" is the theme song of the South Fremantle Football Club, played as the league team comes to the field at home and away games, and after a victory.
We are the mighty bulldogs
Always fighting on
With victory and flag our goal
With guts and determination
We put the rest to shame
Because our fighting spirit wins the game.

We're the bulldogs (yes we are)
And we're the greatest (yes we are)
The mighty red 'v' which stands for victory
The rough tough bulldogs (yes we are)
South Fremantle (yes we are)
The southerners for ever more
 
Down by the port of Fremantle
We hit them really hard
With true grit and courage we win
So come on Souths let's show them
How to play the game to win
South Fremantle for ever more

We're the bulldogs (yes we are)
And we're the greatest (yes we are)
The mighty red 'v' which stands for victory
The rough tough bulldogs (yes we are)
South Fremantle (yes we are)
The southerners for ever more.

Honours

Club honours

Individual honours 
Sandover medallists: (11 total) 1928: Jack Rocchi, 1937: Frank Jenkins, 1947: Clive Lewington, 1952: Steve Marsh, 1955: John Todd, 1980: Stephen Michael, 1981: Stephen Michael, 1986: Mark Bairstow, 1989: Craig Edwards, 2005: Toby McGrath, 2017: Haiden Schloithe
Tassie Medallists: (2 total) 1983: Stephen Michael, 1984: Brad Hardie
All Australians: (6 total) 1953: Steve Marsh, 1956: John Gerovich & Cliff Hillier, 1961: John Todd, 1972: Brian Ciccotosto, 1983: Stephen Michael 1983
Bernie Naylor Medallists: (21 total) Harvey (Duff) Kelly (50) 1905; George (Snowy) Thomas (31) 1910; Bonny Campbell (47) 1922; Sol Lawn (75) 1928 & (96) 1929; Bernie Naylor (131) 1946, (108) 1947, 91 (1948), (147) 1952, (167) 1953, (133) 1954; John Gerovich (74) 1956, (101) 1960 & (74) 1961; Ray Bauskis (108) 1977 & (82) 1978; Craig Edwards (54) 1992; Jon Dorotich (88) 1996 & (114) 1997; Zane Parsons (65) 2002; Ben Saunders (66) 2012 & (59) 2014 & (52) 2016

Records
Highest Score: Round 21, 1981 – 40.18 (258) vs. West Perth at Fremantle Oval
Lowest Score: Round 5, 1904 – 0.4 (4) vs. East Fremantle at Fremantle Oval
Greatest Winning Margin: Round 3, 1999 – 195 points vs. Peel at Fremantle Oval
Greatest Losing Margin: Round 1, 1944 – 256 points vs. East Perth at Perth Oval
Most Games: Marty Atkins 266
Most Goals: Bernie Naylor 1,023 (1941, 1946–1954)
Longest winning streak (league): 17 games from Round 2, 1953 to Round 18, 1953
Longest losing streak (league): 18 games from Round 4, 1987 to Round 21, 1987
Most goals in a season: 167 by Bernie Naylor in 1953
Most goals in a game: 23 by Bernie Naylor vs. Subiaco in 1953
Record Home Attendance: Round 10, 1979 – 23,109 vs. East Fremantle
Record Finals Attendance: 1979 Grand Final – 52,781 vs East Fremantle at Subiaco Oval [ Highest Ever WAFL Game Attendance Record]

Notable players and coaches

Australian Football Hall of Fame
Ten former South Fremantle players have been inducted in the Australian Football Hall of Fame.  Stephen Michael was the first to be inducted in 1999. Steve Marsh and Peter Matera were both in inducted in 2006 followed by Glen Jakovich in 2008, Hassa Mann in 2013, Peter Bell in 2015, Maurice Rioli and Ray Sorrell in 2016 and Bernie Naylor in 2018. John Todd was inducted in the coaches category in 2003.

West Australian Football Hall of Fame
With the exception of Hassa Mann, each of the South Fremantle players in the Australian Football Hall of Fame is also an inductee in the West Australian Football Hall of Fame, with Marsh, Todd and Michael awarded legends status.

Inaugural inductees (2004): Nashy Brentnall, Mal Brown, Bonny Campbell, John Gerovich, Brad Hardie, Ross Hutchinson, Frank Jenkins, Clive Lewington, Steve Marsh, Stephen Michael, Bernie Naylor, Maurice Rioli, Ray Sorrell, John Todd, John Worsfold 
2005 Inductee: Peter Sumich 
2006 Inductees: Peter Matera, Charlie Tyson 
2008 Inductees: Dave Ingraham, Glen Jakovich, George Grljusich
2009 Inductee: Nicky Winmar
2010 Inductees: Mark Bairstow, Frank Treasure
2012 Inductee: Barry White
2013 Inductees: Ray Richards, Peter Bell
2015 Inductees: Tom Grljusich, Paul Hasleby

South Fremantle Football Club Hall of Fame

The South Fremantle Hall of Fame was inaugurated in 2011 with an initial induction of 45 players, coaches, administrators and staff from the club's inception in 1900 to 1979. 

The second induction occurred in 2015, mainly covering the years up to and including 1987 (the year West Coast entered the VFL), and eight of the existing members from the inaugural intake were elevated to legend status.

The third intake occurred on 14 August 2021, with a further eight members inducted and two existing members elevated to Legend status.

There are currently 88 members in the club Hall of Fame. The current ten club legends, in alphabetical order by surname, are: 
 Brian Ciccotosto
 John Gerovich
 Frank Jenkins
 Clive Lewington
 Steve Marsh
 Stephen Michael
 Bernie Naylor
 Tony Parentich
 John Todd
 Frank Treasure

South Fremantle Indigenous Team of the Century
During NAIDOC Week in 2009, South Fremantle celebrated their long and extensive link to Indigenous Australians by naming an Indigenous Team of the century from the 78 Indigenous players that had played for them since Jimmy Melbourne first played in 1902.  Selected by former club captain and chief executive Brian Ciccotosto, premiership coach Mal Brown and journalist Ray Wilson. Four of the players selected, Stephen Michael, Maurice Rioli, Nicky Winmar and Peter Matera, were also selected in the Australia-wide Indigenous Team of the Century.

Military service

South Fremantle footballers at VFL/AFL level

Since the expansion of the Victorian Football League to become the national elite league in the late 1980s, numerous players from South Fremantle have represented various teams, especially the two Western Australia-based teams, West Coast and Fremantle. The list below is a summary of South Fremantle players who have achieved the highest individual honours while playing for a VFL/AFL club.

 Brownlow Medal: Brad Hardie (1985) 
 Norm Smith Medal: Maurice Rioli (1982), Peter Matera (1992)
 All-Australian team: Bruce Monteath (1979), Maurice Rioli (1983, 1986), Brad Hardie (1986), Mark Bairstow (1987, 1991, 1992), Peter Matera (1991, 1993, 1994, 1996, 1997), Nicky Winmar (1991, 1995), David Hart (1994), Glen Jakovich (1994, 1995), Peter Bell (1999, 2003), Darren Gaspar (2000, 2001), Phil Matera (2003), James Clement (2004, 2005), Tim Kelly (2019)
 VFL/AFL Premiership: Colin Beard (1969), Bruce Monteath (1980), Jon Dorotich (1987), Glen Jakovich (1992, 1994), Peter Matera (1992, 1994), Peter Sumich (1992, 1994), John Worsfold (1992, 1994), David Hart (1994), Peter Bell (1996, 1999), Ashley McGrath (2003), Mark Williams (2008), Shai Bolton (2019, 2020), Marlion Pickett (2019, 2020)

References and notes

External links 

 

West Australian Football League – Official WAFL site

 
West Australian Football League clubs
WAFL Women's
Sport in Fremantle
Australian rules football clubs established in 1900
Australian rules football clubs in Western Australia
1900 establishments in Australia
Sporting clubs in Perth, Western Australia
South Fremantle, Western Australia